The Nymphai Hyperboreioi were nymphs in Greek mythology who presided over aspects of archery.

Hekaerge represented distancing. A daughter of Boreas, and one of the Hyperborean maidens, who were believed to have introduced the worship of Artemis in Delos. (Callim. Hymn. in Del. 292; Paus. i. 43. § 4, v. 7. § 4; Herod. iv. 35.) The name Hecaerge signifies hitting at a distance; and it is not improbable that the story of the Hyperborean maiden may have arisen out of an attribute of Artemis, who bore the surname of Hecaerge. (Anton. Lib. 13.) Aphrodite had the same surname at Iulis in Cos. (Anton. Lib. 1.)

Loxo represented trajectory. A daughter of Boreas, one of the Hyperborean maidens, who brought the worship of Artemis to Delos, whence it is also used as a surname of Artemis herself. (Callim. Hymn. in Del. 292; Nonnus, Dionys. v. p. 168; comp. Spanheim, ad Callim. l. c.)

Oupis represented aim. A Hyperborean maiden, who together with Arge carried an offering, which had been vowed for the birth of Apollo and Artemis, to Eileithyia, at Delos. (Herod. iv. 35.)

See also
 List of Greek mythological figures

References

Nymphs
Hyperborea